Papilio wilsoni is a butterfly in the family Papilionidae. It is found in Ethiopia.

Taxonomy
Papilio wilsoni belongs to a clade called the nireus species-group with 15 members.  The pattern is  black with green bands and spots and the butterflies, although called swallowtails lack tails with the exception of Papilio charopus and Papilio hornimani. The clade members are:

Papilio aristophontes Oberthür, 1897
Papilio nireus Linnaeus, 1758 
Papilio charopus Westwood, 1843
Papilio chitondensis de Sousa & Fernandes, 1966 
Papilio chrapkowskii Suffert, 1904 
Papilio chrapkowskoides Storace, 1952 
Papilio desmondi van Someren, 1939 
Papilio hornimani Distant, 1879 
Papilio interjectana Vane-Wright, 1995 
Papilio manlius Fabricius, 1798
Papilio microps Storace, 1951
Papilio sosia Rothschild & Jordan, 1903
Papilio thuraui Karsch, 1900
Papilio ufipa Carcasson, 1961
Papilio wilsoni Rothschild, 1926

References

wilsoni
Butterflies described in 1926
Endemic fauna of Ethiopia